Dr. Tara Elizabeth Lewis is a fictional character in the CBS crime drama Criminal Minds, portrayed by Aisha Tyler. Lewis is a forensic psychologist and a Supervisory Special Agent of the FBI's Behavioral Analysis Unit. Lewis first appeared in "The Job", serving as a temporary replacement for Agents Kate Callahan (Jennifer Love Hewitt) and Jennifer Jareau (A.J. Cook) while they were both on maternity leave.

Aisha Tyler was slated to appear in only the first six episodes of Season 11 but the producers "loved her so much" that they extended her role. She then appeared in 18 episodes that season. Tyler was then promoted to series regular in Season 12.

Development
After the end of Season 10, showrunner Erica Messer said that she wanted to have "a fun guest star" while both Jennifer Love Hewitt and A.J. Cook were on maternity leave during Season 11. Messer said that her original plan was not to replace both Hewitt and Cook, and that there was "an opportunity there to have fun for a few episodes". In an interview with TV Guide, Messer expressed her interest in bringing back characters from previous seasons instead of adding a new character to replace Hewitt permanently on the show. She explained, "I feel like when you look at 10 years of people we could bring back, it would be fun to do that". Messer added that bringing back old characters would allow the show to focus on the team without having to service a new regular character.

On June 22, 2015, it was announced that Aisha Tyler had been cast in a recurring role as Dr. Tara Lewis to temporarily replace both Hewitt and Cook. Messer said that Tyler's character was only meant to appear in the first six episodes of Season 11 with the possibility of extending her role. In September 2015, the producers decided to extend her role and Tyler went on to appear in twelve more episodes that season. In July 2016, Tyler was promoted from her previous recurring status to series regular.

Characterization
Tyler described her character as "fun" saying "she's funny and engaged and passionate, so I think she connects with the team in that way. She means business for sure." 
During Tyler's first season on the show, she wore a "pixie wig". Tyler had asked that her character have short hair when she joined the show as it would suit her character. This would also allow the audience "to see that Tara Lewis is different from me and any of my other dramatic roles".

Background
Lewis is very intelligent, and holds a degree from Dartmouth College. She joined the FBI as a forensic psychologist who interviews a number of psychopathic criminals to determine whether they are fit for trial. Through her job, she has encountered a number of depraved minds, giving her the experience necessary to join the BAU. Before joining the BAU, Lewis worked at the San Francisco FBI field office. In recent seasons, she is engaged to a man named Doug Fuller (Rob Kirkland), which causes her some personal distress after other women begin flirting with him.

Due to a childhood spent traveling around the world, Lewis is fluent in both French and German. Lewis revealed in the episode "Mirror Image" that she was bullied throughout her childhood due to her name, resulting in her brother giving her the nickname "T". She is a fan of classic rock bands such as Led Zeppelin, The Doors and the Jimi Hendrix Experience.

In "The Witness", Lewis tells Spencer Reid (Matthew Gray Gubler) that when interviewing serial killers, she tries to find something about them she can identify with to establish a therapeutic alliance, which is key to establishing a relationship between psychologist and killer. For example, she bonds with one killer by pointing out that their mothers attended the same elementary school, and that they both liked fossils as children.

In "False Flag", Lewis becomes upset after a suspect, Melissa Miller (Zelda Williams), tells her that she believes the Sandy Hook Elementary School shooting was staged. Lewis then reveals to the team that she was present at Sandy Hook on the day of the shooting. She tells the team that she provided counseling to the parents of the shooter's victims and that she also saw the victims' bodies, which severely traumatized her.

She was briefly married to Daryl Wright (Gale Harold), but they divorced because of his drug addiction.

Storylines

Season 11
In the season 11 premiere, "The Job", the BAU is short two profilers. Supervisor Aaron Hotchner (Thomas Gibson) starts interviewing applicants for the open spot on the team. He speaks briefly to Lewis, a forensic psychologist whose skill set is not quite what they are looking for in the BAU. Lewis tells Hotchner that interviewing serial killers is one thing and hunting them is another: "For twelve years, I've studied these men after they were caught. Now I want to catch them." Lewis gets a chance to prove herself during the case when the killer calls home on the victim's phone once they arrive at their destination, and Hotchner has her pretend to be the victim's wife. She tries to relay the message that he needs to get his head down so they can get a shot on the killer. Instead, the victim grabs his gun and turns to shoot the killer. After Lewis' work on the call, Hotchner tells her that she has the job

Season 12
In "Mirror Image", Lewis' brother Gabriel (Terrence Terrell) is abducted by serial killer Peter Lewis (Bodhi Elfman), aka "Mr. Scratch", who brainwashes a man named Desmond Holt (Alimi Ballard) to take Gabriel's place. In "True North", while Reid is in prison on a false murder charge, Lewis is given an opportunity to visit him and act as his psychiatrist. Lewis gives Reid a cognitive interview, during which he reveals he stabbed the victim, Nadie Ramos (Ani Sava) to death. However, she later tells Emily Prentiss (Paget Brewster) that she believes he manufactured the memory in a desperate attempt to find an answer to his circumstances. She resumes the interview the next day, and Reid seems to remember the murder a little more clearly, recalling someone spraying a fine mist in his face while he was in a hotel room with Ramos. This matched the M.O. of Peter Lewis, the BAU's prime suspect. However, when Lewis presses further, Reid remembers that the person who was in the hotel with him and Ramos was not Peter Lewis, but a woman. In the season 12 finale, "Red Light", the team gets a new lead on Peter Lewis' current location. However, their SUVs are disabled by spike-strips and struck by a semi-truck. The SUV Lewis was in takes most of the impact, and as a result, she nearly goes into shock due to internal bleeding in the adjacent Season 13 premiere.

Season 16
Although she is pansexual, Tara Lewis is shown to be in a lesbian relationship with a DOJ employee named Rebecca Wilson (Nicole Pacent). Tara at first only reveals the information about her relationship to Emily.  In the season 16 episode "True Conviction", Tara uses the fact that she is in a same-sex relationship to relate to a closeted gay inmate, who is on death row for a crime he did not commit.

Reception
Douglas Wolfe of TV Fanatic in 2015 said the introduction of Aisha Tyler's character, Dr. Tara Lewis, was "the saving grace, and a reason for hope for this season". Meredith Jacobs of Buddy TV wrote that the character of Tara Lewis was "good, as is Tyler in the role, in a way that I want to see more of her but I don't feel is in any way taking away from the regular team members". She also wrote that, "Tara brings something new to the show that we haven't seen quite that much of before". In 2016 while reviewing "Mirror Image", Angela Niles described Lewis as "eager and dedicated to the job without taking away from any of the others’ skills, and comes off as a like-able, supportive team member". She noted that her character had "remained something of a mystery" during her first two seasons on the show. Jay Ruymann of Tell-Tale TV said that "Criminal Minds has not made a better decision in the past decade than casting Aisha Tyler as Tara Lewis".

References

Criminal Minds characters
Television characters introduced in 2015
Fictional Federal Bureau of Investigation personnel
Fictional African-American people
American female characters in television